Stone Age Cartoons is a 1940 American series of twelve animated short films from Fleischer Studios. The films are set in the stone-age era, much like the 1960s series The Flintstones. When they did not get the anticipated reception, Fleischer turned their attention to the Gabby cartoon series.

Filmography

References

External links 
Stone Age Cartoons theatrical series at the Big Cartoon DataBase

Film series introduced in 1940
Fleischer Studios short films
Animated film series
Animated films about dinosaurs